Kherreh or Kharreh may refer to:
 Kherreh, Bushehr
 Kherreh, Fars

See also
 Kherreh Siah
 Mian Kherreh